The name Sonamu has been used for three tropical cyclones in the Western Pacific Ocean. The name was submitted by North Korea and is a Korean word (Chosongul: 소나무 [sʰo̞na̠mu], NKR: sonamu) for pine.

 Severe Tropical Storm Sonamu (2000) (T0017, 25W) – approached Japan.
 Tropical Storm Sonamu (2006) (T0611, 12W, Katring) – no threat to land; wind sheared due to its proximity to Tropical Storm Wukong.
 Severe Tropical Storm Sonamu (2013) (T1301, 01W, Auring) – hit the Philippines.

In February 2014, the name Sonamu was Retired by the ESCAP/WMO Typhoon Committee and replaced with Jongdari for the 2018 season.

Pacific typhoon set index articles